In geometry, the orthocentroidal circle of a non-equilateral triangle is the circle that has the triangle's orthocenter and centroid at opposite ends of its diameter. This diameter also contains the triangle's nine-point center and is a subset of the Euler line, which also contains the circumcenter outside the orthocentroidal circle.

Andrew Guinand showed in 1984 that the triangle's incenter must lie in the interior of the orthocentroidal circle, but not coinciding with the nine-point center; that is, it must fall in the open orthocentroidal disk punctured at the nine-point center.
 
The incenter could be any such point, depending on the specific triangle having that particular orthocentroidal disk.

Furthermore, the Fermat point, the Gergonne point, and the symmedian point are in the open orthocentroidal disk punctured at its own center (and could be at any point therein), while the second Fermat point and Feuerbach point are in the exterior of the orthocentroidal circle. The set of potential locations of one or the other of the Brocard points is also the open orthocentroidal disk.

The square of the diameter of the orthocentroidal circle is   where a, b, and c are the triangle's side lengths and D is the diameter of its circumcircle.

References

Circles defined for a triangle